Toftøyna or Toftøy is an island in Øygarden municipality in Vestland county, Norway.  The  island is the southernmost of the main islands of Øygarden.  It is connected by bridge to the island of Rongøy (to the north), to the small island of Turøy (to the southwest), and to the island of Misje in Fjell municipality (to the south).  Toftøyna is connected to the mainland by a series of bridges by heading south via Misje island.

There are 2 main settlements on the rocky island: Vikavågen on the southeastern shore and Torsteinsvik on the northwestern shore. The main road on the island is Norwegian County Road 561 which runs between the two villages, connecting it to the surrounding islands.  The Hjeltefjorden flows along the eastern shore of the island and the North Sea lies to the west.  There are two small straits to the north and south of the island, separating it from the neighboring islands of Rongøy and Misje.

See also
List of islands of Norway

References

Islands of Vestland
Øygarden